Chromolaena is a genus of about 165 species of perennials and shrubs in the family Asteraceae. It refers to the colored phyllaries of some species. Members of the genus are native to the Americas, from the southern United States to South America (especially Brazil). One species, Chromolaena odorata, has been introduced to many parts of the world where it is considered a weed.

The plants of this genus were earlier taxonomically classified under the genus Eupatorium, but are now considered to be more closely related to other genera in the tribe Eupatorieae.

Species
There are about 165 species, including:
 Chromolaena bigelovii (A.Gray) R.M.King & H.Rob. – Bigelow's thoroughwort
 Chromolaena borinquensis (Britt.) R.M.King & H.Rob. – limestone thoroughwort 
 Chromolaena corymbosa (Aubl.) R.M.King & H.Rob. – Caribbean thoroughwort
 Chromolaena frustrata (B.L.Rob.) R.M.King & H.Rob. – Cape Sable thoroughwort
 Chromolaena geraniifolia (Urb.) R.M.King & H.Rob. – geraniumleaf thoroughwort (Puerto Rico)
 Chromolaena hirsuta (Hook. & Arn.) R.M.King & H.Rob.
 Chromolaena impetiolaris (Griseb.) Nicolson 
 Chromolaena integrifolia (Bertero ex Spreng.) R.M.King & H.Rob.
 Chromolaena ivifolia R.M.King & H.Rob. – ivyleaf thoroughwort
 Chromolaena macrodon (DC.) Nicolson
Chromolaena misella (McVaugh) R.M.King & H.Rob.
 Chromolaena odorata (L.) R.M.King & H.Rob. – Jack in the bush
 Chromolaena oteroi (Monachino) R.M.King & H.Rob. – Mona Island thoroughwort	
Chromolaena sagittata (A.Gray) R.M.King & H.Rob. 
 Chromolaena sinuata (Lam.) R.M.King & H.Rob. – wavyleaf thoroughwort
 Chromolaena squalida (DC.) R.M.King & H.Rob.
 Chromolaena trigonocarpa (Griseb.) R.M.King & H.Rob.
Chromolaena xalapana B.L.Turner

In Australia some species are called "triffid weed"

References

 
Asteraceae genera